Kosti Klemelä (29 February 1920 – 26 March 2006) was a Finnish actor. He is best remembered for playing the role of Lt. Koskela in the Edvin Laine film The Unknown Soldier (1955). In addition to his film career, he worked for the Finnish National Theatre until his retirement. He considered his theatrical career to be more important to him than his film career.

He is buried in the Hietaniemi Cemetery in Helsinki.

Filmography

References

External links

1920 births
2006 deaths
People from Loimaa
Finnish male film actors
20th-century Finnish male actors
Finnish male stage actors
Burials at Hietaniemi Cemetery